Argentina held legislative elections in 1948 were held on 7 March.

Background

Elected in early 1946 on a populist platform, President Juan Perón undertook a program of nationalization of strategic industries and services, as well as the vigorous support of demands for higher wages (led by the rapidly growing CGT labor union). He also took care to cultivate Church-state relations in Argentina, making religious instruction mandatory and regularly consulting the Archbishop of Buenos Aires, Cardinal Copello, on social policy. These moves and economic growth of nearly a fourth in his first two years led to a positive showing in legislative elections on March 7 - held only week after the nationalization of British railways in Argentina, and during Perón's appendectomy. Half the seats in the Lower House were renewed, and its makeup changed only somewhat in favor of Peronists.

The opposition had dissolved their 1945 alliance, the Democratic Union; but they rallied behind and largely endorsed the only party significant enough to challenge Perón: the centrist Radical Civic Union (UCR). The president moved quickly to consolidate his political power, replacing the Labor Party that elected him with a Peronist Party, in 1947, and purging universities and the Supreme Court of opposition. The brazen moves were followed by the Peronists' introduction in Congress of a bill mandating an assembly for the replacement of the 1853 Constitution. Debate in Congress, where the UCR had retained a sizable minority, was heated throughout 1948, though the bill was approved by 96 out of 158 congressmen. The UCR itself was divided during the vote; a faction that had supported Perón (the "Renewal Group," led by Amadeo Sabattini) abstained in an attempt to deprive the vote of quorum, and ultimately broke with Perón.

Elections for the 158 assemblymen were called for December 5. Results closely mirrored those of the legislative elections, though blank voting increased as a result of Congressman Sabattini's call. One Peronist assemblyman was elected as a "Labor Party" candidate, joining Sabattini's opposition to its redesignation as a "Peronist" party. UCR assemblymen, for their part, attended only the inaugural session to espress their opposition to the body's legality. The assembly concluded its proceeding on March 16, 1949, with a new constitution granting the president the right to seek reelection, depriving Congress of its right to override vetoes, enacting social guarantees, and enhancing the state's rights over natural resources - all designed to advance Perón's agenda at the time.

Results

Results by province

References

1948
1948 elections in South America
1948 in Argentina